Örö  is a large island in the Archipelago Sea in Finland. It is part of the municipality of Kimitoön. The island remained a military area until 2015, when it became part of the Archipelago National Park and became available to tourists.

References

External links

Örö at nationalparks.fi

Finnish islands in the Baltic
National parks of Finland